Acromyrmex ambiguus is a species of New World ants of the subfamily Myrmicinae found in the wild naturally in southern Brazil, Paraguay and Uruguay. Commonly known as "leaf-cutter ants", they are a species of ant from one of the two genera of advanced fungus-growing ants within the tribe Attini.

References

Acromyrmex
Hymenoptera of South America
Insects described in 1888

pl:Acromyrmex
ru:Муравьи-листорезы